Château de Saint-Germain-du-Salembre is a château in Saint-Germain-du-Salembre, Dordogne, Nouvelle-Aquitaine, France.

Châteaux in Dordogne
Monuments historiques of Dordogne